Lotus is an unincorporated community in Champaign County, Illinois, United States. Lotus is located along a railroad line southwest of Foosland. The railroad station and post office there were known as Howard until they were renamed Lotus in 1902.

The community has long talked of becoming incorporated, but due to the high costs of the process its few residents have always opted against it.  Currently home to 102 residents, Lotus is named after Captain James Ruthermore Lotus, who was a soldier in the Civil War.  His son, Abraham Lotus, moved to the area well after the war and established the town, naming it after himself and his father.

While most of the residents work and shop outside of town, there are a few local businesses and bars.  The largest employer in Lotus is Fergueson & Sons factory, where they make novelty bookmarks that are sold exclusively to Oriental Trading in Omaha, Nebraska.

Lotus has a sister unincorporated city program with the residents of Hyrum, Ontario.  The program was started after Lotus resident Phyllis Flankmen was driving through Canada on her way to Niagara Falls with her sister Blaire when they needed to stop for gas.  Since neither town has a council, mayor or anything of the like, Phyllis took it upon herself to set up this program with Hyrum resident Dorris DeLaney.  Phyllis and Dorris exchanged homemade knitted blankets that symbolize the unity between these two unincorporated towns.

References

Unincorporated communities in Champaign County, Illinois
Unincorporated communities in Illinois